Corybas cryptanthus, commonly known as the hidden spider orchid or icky, is a species of terrestrial orchid endemic to New Zealand. It has no obvious leaves and the mostly white flower is usually buried in leaf litter.

Description 
Corybas cryptanthus is a terrestrial, perennial, saprophytic, herb with its leaves reduced to tiny triangular scales on horizontal rhizoids buried in leaf litter. There is a single more or transparent whitish to pinkish flower with red or purple streaks. The lateral sepals and petals are thread-like, the lateral sepals longer than the petals and often appear above the leaf litter.

Taxonomy 
Edwin Hatch was the first to formally describe this species in 1951 but he gave it the name Corybas saprophyticus, unaware that the name had already been used for a different orchid. The name was therefore a nom. illeg. and in 1956 Hatch changed the name to Corybas cryptanthus. The original and the corrected descriptions were published in Transactions and Proceedings of the Royal Society of New Zealand. The specific epithet (cryptanthus) is derived from Ancient Greek words kryptos meaning "hidden" or "secret" and anthos meaning "flower".

Distribution and habitat
The hidden spider orchid grows in dense shrubland and tall forest in partly decomposed leaf litter. It occurs on the North, South and Three Kings Islands.

Ecology
It has been suggested that C. cryptanthus is partly a parasite on the roots of southern beech trees, obtaining nutrients via a fungus.

References 

cryptanthus
Orchids of New Zealand
Plants described in 1956
Endemic flora of New Zealand